Matthias Mawson (August 1683 – 23 November 1770) was an English clergyman  and academic who served as Master of Corpus Christi College, Cambridge and subsequently as Bishop of Llandaff, Bishop of Chichester, and Bishop of Ely.

Life
He was born in August 1683, his father being a prosperous brewer at Chiswick, Middlesex. He was educated at St Paul's School, and was admitted in 1701 to Corpus Christi College, Cambridge. He graduated B.A. 1704, M.A. 1708, B.D. 1716, D.D. 1725. He was a fellow of his college in 1707, and a moderator in the university in 1708. On 6 October 1724 he was appointed as master of his college, and held the office till 20 February 1744. Soon after his appointment he was presented by Bishop Thomas Green to the rectory of Conington in Cambridgeshire, and afterwards to that of Hadstock in Essex; the latter he held for many years. In 1730 and 1731 he was a reforming vice-chancellor of the university, in particular prohibiting the practice of exhuming bodies from the neighbouring churchyard, for dissection by medical students.

After refusing the bishopric of Gloucester in 1734, Mawson was consecrated bishop of Llandaff, 18 February 1739. This diocese he administered for two years, and in 1740 was translated to Chichester. On the death of Sir Thomas Gooch in 1754, he was translated again, to Ely, where he remained for the rest of his life. 

According to Arthur Collins' Peerage of England (1756) he married Penelope Compton, a daughter of Hatton Compton (d.1741) of Grendon Hall
in Northamptonshire, Lieutenant of the Tower of London and a grandson of Spencer Compton, 2nd Earl of Northampton. However the Dictionary of National Biography (1885-1900) states that he was unmarried. He died at his house in Kensington Square, 23 November 1770, aged eighty-seven years and three months, having been active and healthy until before his death. He was buried in his cathedral of Ely, and a monument was erected to his memory by his chaplain and executor, Dr. Warren.

Legacy
Mawson's official income and his inheritance of the fortune made by his brother in the family business gave him great wealth. To King's College, Cambridge, he made a large loan for their new buildings. At Ely he gave £1,000 to the cathedral. He also endowed Corpus Christi in 1754 with property sufficient to found twelve scholarships.

Works
Mawson's published works consist of single sermons, preached at anniversary gatherings, and the like, and a speech made before the gentlemen of Sussex, at Lewes, 11 October 1745, on the occasion of the Jacobite rising of 1745.

Notes

References

1683 births
1770 deaths
Masters of Corpus Christi College, Cambridge
Bishops of Chichester
Bishops of Ely
Bishops of Llandaff
18th-century Church of England bishops
Vice-Chancellors of the University of Cambridge
People educated at St Paul's School, London
Fellows of Corpus Christi College, Cambridge
18th-century Welsh Anglican bishops
17th-century Anglican theologians
18th-century Anglican theologians